S.S. Lazio finished just above the relegation zone, finishing in 16th in Serie B and reaching the round of 16 in Coppa Italia.

Squad

Goalkeepers
  Mario Ielpo
  Giuliano Terraneo

Defenders
  Luca Brunetti
  Ernesto Calisti
  Daniele Filisetti
  Angelo Gregucci
  Giorgio Magnocavallo
  Raimondo Marino
  Massimo Piscedda
  Gabriele Podavini

Midfielders
  Antonio Elia Acerbis
  Giancarlo Camolese
  Domenico Caso
  Francesco Dell'Anno
  Vincenzo Esposito
  Massimo Falessi
  Francesco Fonte
  Gabriele Pin
  Eugenio Sgarbossa

Attackers
  Giuliano Fiorini
  Paolo Mandelli
  Antonio Piconi
  Fabio Poli
  Antonio Schillaci

Competitions

Serie B

League table

S.S. Lazio seasons
Lazio